The Abbey church in Czerwińsk nad Wisłą, officially known as the Basilica of the Annunciation of Holy Virgin Mary, is a historic church, built in the 12th century. Despite Gothic and Baroque elements added in later centuries, the basilica remains one of the most valuable examples of Romanesque architecture in Poland, and as such it is listed as a Historic Monument of Poland. 

The church was built of granite blocks from locally available boulders, left by the retreating ice sheets of the Pleistocene glaciations. The heterogeneous colouring of the stone, ranging from dark gray through various shades of grey, ochre and pink to red, is considered to enhance the aesthetic value of the building.

Gallery

See also

Catholic Church in Poland

References

Romanesque architecture in Poland
Basilica churches in Poland
12th-century Roman Catholic church buildings in Poland
Płońsk County
Czerwińsk nad Wisłą
The Most Holy Virgin Mary, Queen of Poland